Haqiqat Nagar, also spelled as Hakikat Nagar, is a residential colony in Delhi located near Kingsway Camp in the North West district. The colony was named famous Hindu leader who attained veergati in Lahore, Haqiqat Rai, and is one of the sites where refugees from the Sind and Punjab provinces settled. This colony is part of the Model Town tehsil. The colony is at the crossroads of Mall Road and Banda Bahadur. The GTB Nagar metro station of Delhi Metro provides convenient transportation to other parts of Delhi.

The colony has around 384 houses, two temples, one gurudwara (Sikh temple), one community center and one co-ed primary school. Haqiqat Nagar is very close to the University of Delhi North Campus, and the commercial education centers like Mukherjee Nagar. This area has got a good market popularly termed as Camp Market; making the area very vibrant and dynamic.

References

Neighbourhoods in Delhi
North West Delhi district